Otto Heller, B.S.C. (8 March 1896 – 19 February 1970) was a Czech cinematographer long resident in the United Kingdom. He worked on more than 250 films, including Richard III (1955), The Ladykillers (1955) and Peeping Tom (1960).

Life 
Otto Heller was born in a Jewish family in Prague on 8 March 1896. As a teenager, he became a projectionist in the Lucerna cinema. During World War I, he worked in a film laboratory in Vienna. After the war, he started to work as a documentary cameraman at Pragafilm. During the 1920s, he was the most requested cinematographer in Czechoslovakia. Together with Karel Lamač, Anny Ondra and Václav Wasserman, he made many movies both for domestic and international audience. He often worked with Svatopluk Innemann, Martin Frič and Jan S. Kolár. Because of the rise of Nazism, he left Czechoslovakia in 1938 with Lamač.

In an interview for the extra materials on the Blu-ray Disk version of The Ipcress File, Michael Caine recollects how Otto Heller told the story of leaving Nazi Germany in 1939. His camera crew were all Germans and they kept telling him to leave but he did not believe he neeeded to go and he would refuse, saying they were having a great time doing movies. Then one day his camera operator came dressed in an SS uniform and told to him that he has joined the SS and urged Heller to go "now". Heller told Michael Caine that he "went to the toilet, went out through the toilet window and I never stoppped running till I got to London".

He became a British citizen in 1945. Heller continued to live and make movies in UK until his death.

He died in London on 19 February 1970.

Selected filmography

 The Arrival from the Darkness (1921)
 The Poisoned Light (1921)
 The Cross by the Brook (1921)
 White Paradise (1924)
 The Lantern (1925)
 The Countess from Podskalí  (1926)
 The Kreutzer Sonata (1927)
 Suzy Saxophone (1928)
 Eve's Daughters (1928)
 Sinful and Sweet (1929)
 Street Acquaintances (1929)
 The Girl with the Whip (1929)
 Sin of a Beautiful Woman (1929)
 Prague Seamstresses (1929)
 The Caviar Princess (1930)
 The Cabinet of Doctor Larifari (1930)
 Fairground People (1930)
 St. Wenceslas (1930)
 The Typist (1931)
 Die Fledermaus (1931)
 The Private Secretary (1931)
 Mamsell Nitouche (1932)
 The Ringer (1932)
 Kiki (1932)
 A Night in Paradise (1932)
 The Love Hotel (1933)
 Daughter of the Regiment (1933)
 Public Not Admitted (1933)
 Polish Blood (1934)
 The Switched Bride (1934)
 Little Dorrit (1934)
 A Woman Who Knows What She Wants (1934)
 The Young Count (1935)
 Raging Barbora (1935)
 Knockout (1935)
 Dreams Come True (1936)
 Tomorrow We Live (1936)
 Secret Lives (1937)
 Sarajevo (1940)
 Gaiety George (1946)
 They Made Me a Fugitive (1947)
 Golden Arrow (1949)
 The Queen of Spades (1949)
 I'll Get You for This (1951)
 The Rainbow Jacket (1954)
 The Divided Heart (1954)
 The Ladykillers (1955)
 Richard III (1955)
 The Vicious Circle (1957)
 The Silent Enemy (1958)
 Peeping Tom (1960)
 Victim (1961)
 Light in the Piazza (1962)
 The Curse of the Mummy's Tomb (1964)
 Woman of Straw (1964)
 The Ipcress File (1965)
 Masquerade (1965)
 That Riviera Touch (1966)
 Alfie (1966)
 Funeral in Berlin (1966)
 Billion Dollar Brain (1967)
 Duffy (1968)
 Can Heironymus Merkin Ever Forget Mercy Humppe and Find True Happiness? (1969)
 Bloomfield (1971)

References

External links
 

1896 births
1970 deaths
Best Cinematography BAFTA Award winners
Mass media people from Prague
People from the Kingdom of Bohemia
Czech Jews
Czech cinematographers